Neva Louise Patterson (February 10, 1920 – December 14, 2010) was an American actress.

Early years 
Born on a farm near Nevada, Iowa, Patterson was the daughter of mailman George Patterson and seamstress Marjorie Byers Patterson. After graduating from Nevada High School in 1937, she worked as a secretary in Des Moines before she moved to New York in 1938 and initially worked as a secretary there.

Career 
Early in her career, Patterson acted on radio in Chicago and sang for dance bands.

She made her Broadway debut in 1947's The Druid Circle. Her work on Broadway also included Romantic Comedy (1979), Make a Million (1958), Speaking of Murder (1956), Double in Hearts (1956), The Seven Year Itch (1952), Lace on Her Petticoat (1951), The Long Days (1951), Ring Round the Moon (1950), I Know My Love (1949), The Ivy Green (1949), and Strange Bedfellows (1948).

In 1952, she played Helen Sherman in The Seven Year Itch. Her first feature movie was Taxi (1953). Other film credits include The Buddy Holly Story, All of Me (1984), and An Affair to Remember (1957). Also in 1957, she played the beleaguered Miss Warriner is Desk Set.

Patterson portrayed Ma Ketchum in Nichols, Maggie McCloud in The Governor & J.J., Ilene in the NBC drama Berringer's, and Margaret Brimble in Doc Elliott on ABC. She also hosted the game show Manhattan Honeymoon on ABC. Her other television credits included Cagney and Lacey, in which she played Muriel Lacey, and as Eleanor Dupres in V, which she reprised in V: The Final Battle. She made guest appearances on Appointment with Adventure, The Defenders, Ben Casey, Maude, Family, Ironside, Charlie's Angels, Barnaby Jones, The Dukes of Hazzard, The Waltons, The Rockford Files, In the Heat of the Night and St. Elsewhere.

Personal life 
Patterson initially married Thomas Gallagher, and they divorced in 1948. On March 22, 1953, she married Michael Ellis March; they divorced in 1956. She married James Lee on September 15, 1957, and they remained wed until he died in 2002.

Death 
On December 14, 2010, Patterson died from complications from a broken hip at age 90.

Filmography

 Taxi (1953) - Miss Millard
 The Solid Gold Cadillac (1956) - Amelia Shotgraven
 Desk Set (1957) - Miss Warriner
 An Affair to Remember (1957) - Lois Clark
 Too Much, Too Soon (1958) - Blanche Oehrichs aka Michael Strange
 The Spiral Road (1962) - Louise Kramer
 David and Lisa (1962) - Mrs. Clemens
 Dear Heart (1964) - Connie Templeton
 Counterpoint (1968) - Dorothy
 Skin Game (1971) - Mrs. Claggart
 All The President's Men (1976) - CRP Woman
 The Domino Principle (1977) - Gaddis
 The Buddy Holly Story (1978) - Mrs. Ella Holly
 Star 80 (1983) - Playboy Executive
 V (1983, TV Mini-Series) - Eleanor Dupres
 V: The Final Battle (1984, TV Mini-Series) - Eleanor Dupres
 All of Me (1984) - Gretchen

References

External links
 
 
 

1920 births
2010 deaths
American film actresses
American stage actresses
American television actresses
Actresses from Iowa
People from Nevada, Iowa
Accidental deaths from falls
Accidental deaths in California
20th-century American actresses
21st-century American women